Lorum High Cross is a high cross fragment and National Monument located in Lorum, County Carlow, Ireland The cross belongs to an early monastic site which is associated with Molaise of Leighlin. The remaining cross fragment consists of a granite shaft with a height of 55 cm and a width of 30 cm that resides on a small cairn with a diameter of 210 cm.

References

National Monuments in County Carlow
High crosses in the Republic of Ireland